"Surfin' Bird" is a song performed by American surf rock band The Trashmen, containing the repetitive lyric "the bird is the word". It has been covered many times. It is a combination of two R&B hits by The Rivingtons: "Papa-Oom-Mow-Mow" and "The Bird's the Word".

The song was released as a single in 1963 and reached No. 4 on the Billboard Hot 100. The Trashmen also recorded an album named after the track, released two months later.

History
The Rivingtons followed up their 1963 Billboard Hot 100 hit "Papa-Oom-Mow-Mow" with the similar "The Bird's the Word" in 1963. The Trashmen had not heard this version but saw a band called the Sorensen Brothers playing it. They decided to play the song that night at their own gig. During this first performance, drummer and vocalist Steve Wahrer stopped playing and ad-libbed the "Surfin' Bird" middle section. Despite not knowing "The Bird's the Word" was a Rivingtons song, the similarity to "Papa-Oom-Mow-Mow" was obvious and the Trashmen added the chorus to the end of their new track.

A local disc jockey, Bill Diehl, was at the gig and convinced the band to record the track. It was recorded at Kay Bank Studios in Minneapolis. Diehl entered it into a local battle of the bands competition and it won. It was then sent to a battle of the bands competition in Chicago where it also won. This led to the group being signed to Garrett Records with the single being quickly released. It reportedly sold 30,000 copies in its first weekend before going on to national success, reaching No. 4 on the Billboard Hot 100. Wahrer was originally credited as the song's writer, but that was changed to The Rivingtons (Al Frazier, Carl White, Sonny Harris, and Turner Wilson Jr.) after the group threatened to sue The Trashmen for plagiarism.

Chart performance

Weekly charts

Year-end charts

Covers
"Surfin' Bird" was covered by the Cramps as their 1978 debut single on Vengeance Records; it also appeared on their 1979 album Gravest Hits and on their 1983 compilation album Off the Bone. The Cramps often ended their concerts with the song.
"Surfin' Bird" was covered by Ramones on their Rocket to Russia album, released on November 4, 1977.
"Surfin' Bird" was covered by Teutonic thrash metal band Sodom on their tenth studio album, M-16.

In popular culture

"Surfin' Bird" was frequently played on Detroit radio and TV stations over the summer of 1976 during segments featuring the Tigers' 21-year old rookie sensation Mark Fidrych. Fidrych was nicknamed "The Bird" because of his supposed resemblance to Sesame Streets Big Bird character, and because of his cartoonish antics on the mound, which included talking to the ball between pitches.  Fidrych was named American League Rookie of the Year in 1976, and finished second in the voting for the American League Cy Young Award.

A 2018 television commercial for Heineken beer, named "New Friends", used the Ramones version.
It also appeared in a Nicktoons UK commercial for Harvey Beaks in 2015.

The song has been used in various films, including Pink Flamingos (1972), E.T. the Extraterrestrial (1982),  Back to the Beach (1987), Full Metal Jacket (1987), Fred Claus (2007), The Villain, and The Big Year (2011). The song is also prominently featured in the Family Guy episode "I Dream of Jesus", in which Peter Griffin overhears the song at a diner and it turns out to be his favorite childhood song. He proceeds to annoy his family by taking the record from the diner and playing the song virtually nonstop for the rest of the episode. "Surfin' Bird" has since become a recurring gag on the show.

A cover of "Surfin' Bird" was also the theme song of the 1998 animated series Birdz. "Surfin' Bird" is one of the playable songs on the 2009 Wii video game, Just Dance.

References

External links
 Biography and discography of The Trashmen
 surfin' bird references
 Music video on YouTube.
  on YouTube.

1963 songs
1963 debut singles
Ramones songs
The Trashmen songs
Novelty songs
Hep Stars songs
Songs about birds
Songs involved in plagiarism controversies